Thomas Patrick Cronin (born 17 December 1932) is a former English professional footballer who played as an inside forward for Fulham and Reading.

References

1932 births
Living people
People from Richmond, London
Footballers from Greater London
Association football inside forwards
English footballers
Fulham F.C. players
Reading F.C. players